Daniil Andreyevich Golubev (born 20 September 2001) is a Russian tennis player.

Golubev made his ATP main draw debut at the 2020 St. Petersburg Open after receiving a wildcard for the doubles main draw with Evgenii Tiurnev and advanced to the quarterfinals after a James Duckworth withdrawal.

References

External links

2001 births
Living people
Russian male tennis players